HMS Gretna was a Hunt-class minesweeper of the Royal Navy ordered towards the end of World War I and sold for breaking up in 1928. She is the only ship of the Royal Navy to be named Gretna.

See also
Gretna, Scotland

References
 

Hunt-class minesweepers (1916)
Royal Navy ship names
Ships built on the River Tyne
1918 ships